Rich Bitch may refer to:
"Rich Bitch", a song by South African duo Die Antwoord on their album $O$
"Rich Bitch", a song by Australian rock band The Screaming Jets on their album Tear of Thought